Señorita (the Spanish honorific equivalent of Miss) may refer to:

Film
Senorita (film), a 1927 American silent film
Señorita, a 2011 film directed by Isabel Sandoval

Music 
"Señorita" (Don Williams song), 1987
Señorita EP, by Superdrag, 1999
"Señorita" (Justin Timberlake song), 2003
"Senorita", a song by Jin from The Rest Is History, 2004
"Señorita" (Zindagi Na Milegi Dobara song), 2011
"Señorita", a song by Inna from I Am the Club Rocker, 2011
"Señorita" (Abraham Mateo song), 2012
"Señorita", a French hit song by Christophe, reissued as an acoustic version on Intime, 2014
"Señorita" (Vince Staples song), 2015
"Señorita", a song by Kay One, 2017
"Senorita" ((G)I-dle song), 2019
"Señorita" (Shawn Mendes and Camila Cabello song), 2019

Other uses

Señorita banana, a banana cultivar from the Philippines
Oxyjulis californica, a fish with the common name señorita
Gazelle (sidewheeler 1854), later known as Señorita

See also 

Señor (disambiguation)

Spanish words and phrases